Nikolai Svobodin (20 May 1898 - 20 September 1965) was a Soviet actor of the Socialist realism genre. He was born in village Uzmore, Novouzensk uyezd, Samara Governorate, Russian Empire (modern-day Engelssky District, Saratov Oblast, Russia) as Nikolay Kapitonovich Pechkin. 

Svobodin was a recipient of the Order of the Red Banner of Labour, the Medal "For Valiant Labour in the Great Patriotic War 1941–1945" and the Medal "In Commemoration of the 800th Anniversary of Moscow". He was a People's Artist of the RSFSR and a recipient of the Stalin Prize. He was a faculty member at the Gerasimov Institute of Cinematography. He died in Moscow, RSFSR, USSR. He is buried at Novodevichy Cemetery.

Filmography
Lenin in October (1937) as Rutkovsky, the Social Revolutionary
Vysokaya nagrada (25 August 1939)
Lenin in 1918 (7 April 1939) as Rutkovsky, a conspirator
The Great Glinka (1946) as Baron Yegor Rosen
The Court of Honor (1948) as Prof. Sergey Losev
Sud Chesti (1949)
Anna Karenina (1953 film) as diplomat
Attack from the Sea (1953) as Mordovzev
Admiral Ushakov (film) (1953) as Mordovtsev
Matros s Komety (1958)
Northern Story (1960) as Kiselyov
Resurrection (1960 film) as retired colonel

References

External links
 

1898 births
1965 deaths
Soviet male actors
Russian male actors
20th-century Russian male actors
People's Artists of the RSFSR
Stalin Prize winners
Socialist realism
Academic staff of the Gerasimov Institute of Cinematography
Burials at Novodevichy Cemetery